The Essex Society for Archaeology and History is an organization that collects, studies and publishes information on the archaeology and history of the English county of Essex, including areas that since 1965 have belonged to the London boroughs of Barking and Dagenham, Havering, Newham, Redbridge and Waltham Forest.

It was founded in 1852 as the Essex Archaeological Society and adopted its present name in 1985.

History and activities
The Essex Archaeological Society was founded ‘’for the purposes of reading papers, exhibiting antiquities, discussions, etc.’’, on 14 December 1852. The meeting took place at Colchester Town Hall and was attended by local dignitaries such as John Gurdon Rebow (later M.P. for Colchester) and Archdeacon Charles Burney.

In 1860 the Society established a museum, which is still open to the public, at Colchester Castle to display collections of artefacts donated by its members.

The Society publishes its findings in the Transactions of the Essex Society for Archaeology and History, as well as in occasional papers, an annual journal and regular newsletters. It also organises excursions, lectures and other events for members.

Notable members

Rev. Charles Parr Burney, clergyman
Rev. Edward Lewes Cutts, clergyman and writer
Rev. Francis William Galpin, clergyman and musicologist
Frank Aldous Girling, farmer and photographer
John Gurdon Rebow, politician
Charles Gray Round, politician and magistrate
J. Horace Round, historian and genealogist
Rev. Frederick Spurrell, clergyman and archaeologist

References

External links
 Essex Society for Archaeology and History home page

Archaeological organizations
Organizations established in 1852
History of Essex
History organisations based in the United Kingdom
Organisations based in Essex
Text publication societies
1852 establishments in England